Soroly  (or Soroli) (Sóllù) is a village and commune in the Cercle of Bandiagara of the Mopti Region of Mali. It is situated on a rocky plateau. Donno So is spoken in the village. Local surnames are Guindo, Tapily, Kélépily, and Kassogué. The commune contains nine villages and in the 2009 census had a population of 7,885.

References

External links
.

Communes of Mopti Region